Chlorophyll a is a specific form of chlorophyll used in oxygenic photosynthesis. It absorbs most energy from wavelengths of violet-blue and orange-red light, and it is a poor absorber of green and near-green portions of the spectrum. Chlorophyll does not reflect light but chlorophyll-containing tissues appear green because green light is diffusively reflected by structures like cell walls. This photosynthetic pigment is essential for photosynthesis in eukaryotes, cyanobacteria and prochlorophytes because of its role as primary electron donor in the electron transport chain. Chlorophyll a also transfers resonance energy in the antenna complex, ending in the reaction center where specific chlorophylls P680 and P700 are located.

Distribution of chlorophyll a
Chlorophyll a is essential for most photosynthetic organisms to release chemical energy but is not the only pigment that can be used for photosynthesis. All oxygenic photosynthetic organisms use chlorophyll a, but differ in accessory pigments like chlorophyll b. Chlorophyll a can also be found in very small quantities in the green sulfur bacteria, an anaerobic photoautotroph. These organisms use bacteriochlorophyll and some chlorophyll a but do not produce oxygen. Anoxygenic photosynthesis is the term applied to this process, unlike oxygenic photosynthesis where oxygen is produced during the light reactions of photosynthesis.

Molecular structure
The molecular structure of chlorophyll a consists of a chlorin ring, whose four nitrogen atoms surround a central magnesium atom, and has several other attached side chains and a hydrocarbon tail formed by a phytol ester.

Chlorin ring

Chlorophyll a contains a magnesium ion encased in a large ring structure known as a chlorin. The chlorin ring is a heterocyclic compound derived from pyrrole. Four nitrogen atoms from the chlorin surround and bind the magnesium atom. The magnesium center uniquely defines the structure as a chlorophyll molecule. The porphyrin ring of bacteriochlorophyll is saturated, and lacking alternation of double and single bonds causing variation in absorption of light.

Side chains

Side chains are attached to the chlorin ring of the various chlorophyll molecules. Different side chains characterize each type of chlorophyll molecule, and alters the absorption spectrum of light.
 For instance, the only difference between chlorophyll a and chlorophyll b is that chlorophyll b has an aldehyde instead of a methyl group at the C-7 position.

Hydrocarbon tail
The phytol ester of chlorophyll a (R in the diagram) is a long hydrophobic tail which anchors the molecule to other hydrophobic proteins in the thylakoid membrane of the chloroplast. Once detached from the porphyrin ring, phytol becomes the precursor of two biomarkers, pristane and phytane, which are important in the study of geochemistry and the determination of petroleum sources.

Biosynthesis

The Chlorophyll a biosynthetic pathway utilizes a variety of enzymes. In most plants, chlorophyll is derived from glutamate and is synthesised along a branched pathway that is shared with heme and siroheme.
The initial steps incorporate glutamic acid into 5-aminolevulinic acid (ALA); two molecules of ALA are then reduced to porphobilinogen (PBG), and four molecules of PBG are coupled, forming protoporphyrin IX.

Chlorophyll synthase is the enzyme that completes the biosynthesis of chlorophyll a by catalysing the reaction 
chlorophyllide a + phytyl diphosphate  chlorophyll a + diphosphate
This forms an ester of the carboxylic acid group in chlorophyllide a with the 20-carbon diterpene alcohol phytol.

Reactions of photosynthesis

Absorbance of light

Light spectrum

Chlorophyll a absorbs light within the violet, blue and red wavelengths. Accessory photosynthetic pigments broaden the spectrum of light absorbed, increasing the range of wavelengths that can be used in photosynthesis. The addition of chlorophyll b next to chlorophyll a extends the absorption spectrum. In low light conditions, plants produce a greater ratio of chlorophyll b to chlorophyll a molecules, increasing photosynthetic yield.

Light gathering

Absorption of light by photosynthetic pigments converts photons into chemical energy. Light energy radiating onto the chloroplast strikes the pigments in the thylakoid membrane and excites their electrons. Since the chlorophyll a molecules only capture certain wavelengths, organisms may use accessory pigments to capture a wider range of light energy shown as the yellow circles. It then transfers captured light from one pigment to the next as resonance energy, passing energy one pigment to the other until reaching the special chlorophyll a molecules in the reaction center. These special chlorophyll a molecules are located in both photosystem II and photosystem I. They are known as P680 for Photosystem II and P700 for Photosystem I. P680 and P700 are the primary electron donors to the electron transport chain. These two systems are different in their redox potentials for one-electron oxidation. The Em for P700 is approximately 500mV, while the Em for P680 is approximately 1,100-1,200 mV.

Primary electron donation
Chlorophyll a is very important in the energy phase of photosynthesis. Two electrons need to be passed to an electron acceptor for the process of photosynthesis to proceed. Within the reaction centers of both photosystems there are a pair of chlorophyll a molecules that pass electrons on to the transport chain through redox reactions.

See also 
Photosystem II light harvesting protein
Chlorophyll b, another related chemical
Chlorophyll c, an accessory pigment of chlorophyll

References

External links 

Tetrapyrroles
Photosynthetic pigments